Love and Affairs is a 2020 Bengali web series published during the lockdown period. a hoichoi original series, is based on Erich Segal's novel, Love Story. It features Indraneil Sengupta, Barkha Sengupta and Debapriyo Mukherjee in the lead roles.

Description 
Directed by Abhishek Saha this Bengali web series plot revolves around the life of a married couple filled with lies and twists. The relationship between the couple is affected by the few events and a bunch of lies.  With free flow of story-telling and amazing cinematography, the series gives great visual appearance for the audience.
The Series started streaming on the Bengali OTT platform hoichoi from 20 June 2020.

Cast 
Indraneil Sengupta as Abhishek
Barkha Sengupta as Roshni
Debapriyo Mukherjee as Indra
Swapoorna Sen as Sneha

Episodes

Season 1 (2020)
The series started streaming from 20 June 2020 with five episodes.

References

External links

Indian web series
2017 web series debuts
Bengali-language web series
Hoichoi original programming